Aconodes latefasciatus is a species of beetle in the family Cerambycidae. It was described by Holzschuh in 1984. It is known from Nepal.

References

Aconodes
Beetles described in 1984